The 2002 ASB Bank Classic was a women's tennis tournament played on outdoor hard courts at the ASB Tennis Centre in Auckland, New Zealand and was part of Tier IV of the 2002 WTA Tour. It was the 17th edition of the tournament and was held from 31 December 2001 until 5 January 2002. Unseeded Anna Smashnova won the singles title and earned $22,000 first-prize money.

Finals

Singles
 Anna Smashnova defeated  Tatiana Panova 6–2, 6–2
 It was Smashnova's 1st singles title of the year and the 3rd of her career.

Doubles
 Nicole Arendt /  Liezel Huber defeated  Květa Hrdličková /  Henrieta Nagyová 7–5, 6–4

See also
 2002 Heineken Open – men's tournament

External links
 Official website
 ITF tournament edition details
 Tournament draws

ASB Classic
WTA Auckland Open
ASB
ASB
ASB
2002 in New Zealand tennis